Pyramid Island is a conspicuous, pillar-shaped rocky island rising to  off the north entrance to McFarlane Strait in the South Shetland Islands, Antarctica. The vicinity of Pyramid Island was visited on 19 February 1819 during the discovery of the South Shetlands by Captain William Smith in the British brig Williams, and later by early 19th century sealers.

Both the island and the rock were charted and descriptively named by Discovery Investigations personnel in 1935.

Location 

See also 
 Composite Antarctic Gazetteer
 List of Antarctic islands south of 60° S
 SCAR
 Territorial claims in Antarctica

Map
 L.L. Ivanov et al. Antarctica: Livingston Island and Greenwich Island, South Shetland Islands. Scale 1:100000 topographic map. Sofia: Antarctic Place-names Commission of Bulgaria, 2005.

References

External links
 SCAR Composite Antarctic Gazetteer.

Islands of the South Shetland Islands